Everly is a 2014 American action thriller film directed by Joe Lynch and written by Yale Hannon based on a story by Lynch and Hannon. The film stars Salma Hayek as the title character with Akie Kotabe, Jennifer Blanc, Masashi Fujimoto, Togo Igawa, Gabriella Wright, Caroline Chikezie, Laura Cepeda, and Hiroyuki Watanabe in supporting roles.

The film was released via iTunes on January 23, 2015, and received a limited theatrical release on February 27, 2015, by Dimension Films.

Plot
Everly (Salma Hayek), trapped into sexual slavery and abused and assaulted while being forced to work for the brutal Japanese criminal overlord Taiko (Hiroyuki Watanabe), is attacked in her apartment by Taiko's enforcers after he discovers that she has been working with a police officer to damage his organization. Although Taiko expected his men to kill her easily after torturing her, Everly retrieves a gun she had hidden in the toilet and manages to kill all of her attackers. Taiko then begins a sadistic game of toying with Everly, dispatching numerous hired killers and offering the other prostitutes in the building (which he presumably owns) a bounty if they manage to kill her. Meanwhile, Everly attempts to contact her mother Edith (Laura Cepeda) and young daughter Maisey (Aisha Ayamah) to save them from other henchmen of Taiko and get them out of the situation alive, but her mother is being stubborn and refuses to leave without her.

After managing to evade Taiko's attackers for an extended period of time, Everly is captured by The Sadist (Togo Igawa), an assistant of Taiko's. He has her tied up and placed in a cage while he taunts and tortures her with battery and sulfuric acid, along with other corrosive liquids, at one point pouring water into her eyes while she screams in fear, believing it is acid. When The Sadist pours some of the corrosive liquid onto a rope binding her wrist, the rope starts disintegrating. Edith shoots and kills two of The Sadist's henchmen; in return, he begins forcing her mother to drink drain cleaner. The weakened rope breaks after Everly tugs on it; she kills two of the henchmen and wounds The Sadist. She rushes to help Edith, but is subdued by The Sadist, who attempts to stab her mother; Everly resurfaces, disarms The Sadist and forces him to drink one of his acids; he dies violently as Everly and Edith watch in horror.

It is revealed that Everly was a prisoner in the plush apartment after being kidnapped by Taiko four years earlier and forced into sexual slavery. She has had no contact with Edith or Maisey during that time, and her mother is confused and angry at the deadly situation they are suddenly thrust into. As Everly fights off the numerous attacks, some of the hoes become more outlandish; originally they are simply armed thugs, but the Sadist's team appear in costumes and plan for extravagant tortures. The final surge is from a group of what appears to be specialized troops or police officers.

Eventually, Edith is killed by a sniper hired by Taiko from the building across from the apartment on the orders of Taiko to punish Everly. When the sniper shoots a rocket-propelled grenade into the apartment, Taiko beheads him in anger, believing that he killed Everly, though she survives. Everly is finally subdued, but manages to kill Taiko after his soldiers have left by stabbing him with his own sword. One of the Sadist's compatriots, the Masochist, attempts to slash Maisey before Everly kills him with a single headshot. Afterwards, Everly reconciles with Maisey, who was under the protection of one of Everly's enslaved neighbors (who was eventually killed). The film closes with Everly seemingly succumbing to her wounds, but with Maisey still alive and potentially safe with the death of Taiko. However, immediately before the credits, there is audio of a beeping heart-monitor and gasp of breath to indicate that Everly has not died after all.

Cast
 Salma Hayek as Everly	
 Akie Kotabe as Dead Man
 Laura Cepeda as Edith		
 Jennifer Blanc as Dena
 Togo Igawa as The Sadist
 Gabriella Wright as Anna
 Caroline Chikezie as Zelda
 Hiroyuki Watanabe as Taiko
 Jelena Gavrilović as Elyse
 Masashi Fujimoto as The Masochist
 Dragana Atlija as Lizzy
 Aisha Ayamah as Maisey (the little girl)

Production
On February 1, 2012, Kate Hudson joined the cast. On May 10, 2013, Salma Hayek joined the cast to replace Hudson in the lead role.

Release
Everly premiered at Fantastic Fest on September 20, 2014. The film was released on iTunes on January 23, 2015, and was released theatrically on February 27, 2015 by Dimension Films.

Critical reception
Everly received negative reviews from critics. The review aggregator website Rotten Tomatoes reported a 28% approval rating, with a rating average of 4.5/10, based on 57 reviews. The site's consensus states: "Everly benefits from Joe Lynch's stylish direction and Salma Hayek's starring work, but it's too thinly written and sleazily violent to fully recommend." On Metacritic, which assigns a normalized rating out of 100 based on reviews from critics, the film has a score of 35 based on 16 reviews, indicating "generally unfavorable reviews."

References

External links
 
 
 
 

2014 films
2014 action thriller films
American action thriller films
2010s English-language films
2010s Japanese-language films
2010s Spanish-language films
American films about revenge
Films set in apartment buildings
Films set in Japan
Films shot in Serbia
Girls with guns films
American vigilante films
Films directed by Joe Lynch
2010s vigilante films
Yakuza films
Films scored by Bear McCreary
Spanish-language American films
2010s American films
2010s Japanese films